Bishopton (/bɪʃəptən/) is a village in Renfrewshire, Scotland.

History

There was a Roman Fort at Bishopton which was discovered from aerial photographs in 1949. The fort is about 1 km (0.6 mi) west of the village. The fort at Whitemoss Farm may have been held initially from 140 to 155 A.D. Pottery with Antonine era date stamps was found at the site. The pottery and many other finds were catalogued at the Hunterian Museum in Glasgow along with several coeval items like the distance slab of the Twentieth Legion from Old Kilpatrick.
Bishopton was originally in the Parish of Erskine. The name of the village is reflected in a nearby house: Bishopton House. A famous family called the Brisbanes lived there. The house became a convent known as Good Shepherd Centre and latterly Cora Foundation.

The former Royal Ordnance Factory site

A large explosive manufacturing factory was once sited in Bishopton. The Royal Ordnance Factory Bishopton (ROF) was opened during World War II on farm land, acquired by compulsory purchase order. It was situated on the western side of the railway line running through Bishopton. Over  of land from up to seven farms was used to build the factory. The land included Dargavel House. The southern end of the site included the majority of the land formerly used by the World War I National Filling Factory, Georgetown. The ROF was privatised in 1984, being sold to British Aerospace (now BAE Systems), which has since scaled down and shut most of the site. The factory was in use from 1915 until 2002, producing ammunition, explosives and propellants.

After privatisation, the MOD Police moved out and the former MOD Police Social Club at HolmPark, and its adjoining sports field, became part of Bishopton. The former MOD Police houses at both HolmPark and Rossland Crescent were sold off to private buyers. Bishopton's Medical Centre was built in a corner of the sports field, opposite the shops.

Dargavel Village

In 2005, BAE Systems and Redrow submitted proposals to use a large part of the site for building new housing which would, at least, double the size of Bishopton. Local residents indicated their concern at the proposals; the major concerns they had were with the size of the expansion – with the associated knock-on effects to the local infrastructure – and fears of the contamination that was likely to be found on the site. In December 2008 Renfrewshire Council granted outline planning consent for the development and detailed planning consent for a related motorway junction off the A8/M8.

By early 2016, following extensive decontamination work, a significant portion of the development had been completed, with a number of the houses (the total number of dwellings having risen from 2,500 in 2008 to 4,000 in 2019, involving multiple housebuilders) built and inhabited along with some shopping facilities. However, a new primary school which was originally approved in 2009 had still not been completed a decade on and was reassessed to be built in 2021 with fresh concerns over the proposed catchment zone potentially leading to division between the old and new communities in the area, and that the school would simply be too small to cope with the ongoing influx of children, with the majority of the Dargavel housing being marketed for young families to move there.

Education
Bishopton Primary School – a co-educational, non-denominational state school – is the only school within the village, although with so many new houses being built another has been proposed. For secondary education, the village falls within the catchment area of Park Mains High School in Erskine, and within the catchment of Trinity High School in Renfrew, as part of Scotland's network of Catholic educational institutions.

Notable people
 Baroness Goldie, former MSP & leader of the Scottish Conservatives
 Derek Mackay, former MSP & Cabinet Secretary for Finance and the Economy
 Gavin Newlands, MP for Paisley and Renfrewshire North
 Douglas Alexander former MP & Foreign Secretary
 Wendy Alexander, former MSP & leader of Scottish Labour Party

Transport

Before the bridge was built, the Erskine Ferry transported vehicles across the Clyde. The A8 road passes through Bishopton, and the M8 motorway passes to the north, running parallel to the A8, with access to Bishopton from junctions 30 and 31. Bus services are provided by McGill's, with buses operating to Clydebank, Greenock and Erskine.

Bishopton is served by Bishopton railway station on the Inverclyde Line. The station opened in 1841. There are five services per hour (off-peak): four to/from Gourock, and one to/from Wemyss Bay with four per hour in the other direction to and from Glasgow Central. Evenings and Sundays there are two trains per hour to Glasgow Central and hourly services to both Wemyss Bay and Gourock. A short branch to the former ROF factory is now disused.

Geography
Bishopton is situated in the north east of Renfrewshire. It lies to the south of the River Clyde. The village borders a number of nearby settlements, some separated by a rural hinterland. In terms of address names, Bishopton has Crescents, Roads and Drives, but no Streets.

See also

 Blantyre Monument
 Bishopton railway station
 Formakin Estate
 ROF Bishopton

References

External links

Bishopton Community Council

Villages in Renfrewshire